The 2014 SARU Community Cup (known as the 2014 Cell C Community Cup for sponsorship reasons) was the second season of the SARU Community Cup competition. The qualification to the tournament took place in 2013, while the competition proper was contested in 2014. The tournament is the top competition for non-university rugby union clubs in South Africa.

Competition

Qualification format
Qualification to the Community Cup was determined via the club leagues of the fourteen provincial unions, plus Blue Bulls Limpopo. All university and other tertiary institutions were ineligible to participate in the Community Cup.

The highest-placed eligible team in each of the fifteen leagues automatically qualified to the Community Cup (league rules determined if this is after the league stages or after the title-play-offs). As holders, Despatch were guaranteed qualification to the Community Cup. In addition, wildcard teams chosen by SARU also qualified to take the number of participants up to twenty. Teams that participated in the 2013 Community Cup were not eligible for the wildcard draw for the 2014 Community Cup.

Finals format
The format of the Community Cup was the same as the Rugby World Cup. The teams were divided into four pools, each containing five teams. They then played four pool games, playing other teams in their respective pools once. Each team played two home games and two away games.

The winner and runner-up of each pool entered the play-off stage, held at a central venue over the Easter long weekend each year. The play-offs consisted of quarter finals, semi-finals and the final. The winner of each pool met the runner-up of a different pool in a quarter final. The winner of each quarter-final went on to the semi-finals and the semi-final winners to the final, to be held at a neutral venue.

The losing semi-finalists played each other in the Plate final. The losing quarter finalists met in the Bowl semi-final, the winners of which played in the Bowl final, the losers playing in the Shield final.

Qualification
The highest-placed non-university clubs in the 2013 season of each of the fourteen provincial unions' club leagues, as well as defending champions Despatch and wildcard teams all qualified to the 2014 SARU Community Cup competition.

Blue Bulls
The log leader after the pool stage qualified to the 2014 SARU Community Cup. The play-off finals have no bearing on qualification to the 2014 SARU Community Cup.

Semi-finals

Final

Blue Bulls Limpopo
The play-off final winner qualified to the 2014 SARU Community Cup.

Semi-finals

Final

Boland
The log leader after the pool stage qualified to the 2014 SARU Community Cup.

Border
The play-off final winner qualified to the 2014 SARU Community Cup.

Quarter-finals

Semi-finals

Final

Eastern Province
The log leader after the pool stage qualified to the 2014 SARU Community Cup. Despatch qualified as the holders. The play-off finals have no bearing on qualification to the 2014 SARU Community Cup.

Free State
The log leader after the pool stage qualified to the 2014 SARU Community Cup. The play-off finals have no bearing on qualification to the 2014 SARU Community Cup.

Stadsbeker
The Stadsbeker is the title play-off matches.

Semi-final

Final

Rowan Cup
The Rowan Cup is the play-off for fourth to sixth place.

Semi-final

Final

Golden Lions
The log leader after the pool stage qualified to the 2014 SARU Community Cup.

Griffons
The play-off final winner qualified to the 2014 SARU Community Cup.

Semi-finals

Final

Griquas
The log leader after the pool stage qualified to the 2014 SARU Community Cup.

KwaZulu-Natal
The log leader after the pool stage qualified to the 2014 SARU Community Cup.

Leopards
A play-off would be held between Rustenburg Impala, either Klerksdorp or Vaal Reefs and the possibly winner of the Neser A League final, with play-off winner qualifying to the 2014 SARU Community Cup.

Semi-finals

Final

Qualifier

Mpumalanga
The play-off final winner qualified to the 2014 SARU Community Cup.

Semi-finals

Final

South Western Districts
The play-off final winner qualified to the 2014 SARU Community Cup.

Semi-finals

Final

Valke
The play-off final winner qualified to the 2014 SARU Community Cup.

Final

Western Province
The log leader after the pool stage qualified to the 2014 SARU Community Cup.

Wildcard draw
Provincial unions could also enter one team that did not participate in the 2013 Community Cup into the wildcard draw. Teams that played in the 2013 SARU Community Cup were ineligible for wildcard nomination in 2014.

These teams were nominated for the wildcard draw:
 Boksburg (Valke)
 Durban Collegians (KwaZulu-Natal)
 Kimberley Police (Griquas)
 Middelburg (Mpumalanga)
 Mossel Bay Barbarians (South Western Districts)
 Oostelikes Eagles (Blue Bulls) 
 Pirates (Golden Lions)
 Police (Border)
 Spring Rose (Eastern Province)
 Tygerberg (Western Province)
 Vaal Reefs (Leopards)
 Welkom (Griffons)
 Wesbank (Boland)

On 4 November 2013, SARU named the following teams as the wildcard entries for the 2014 Community Cup:
 Boksburg (Valke)
 Mossel Bay Barbarians (South Western Districts)
 Spring Rose (Eastern Province)
 Welkom (Griffons)
 Wesbank (Boland)

Teams
The following teams qualified for the 2014 SARU Community Cup:

Team listing

Pool Stages
On 23 August 2013, the draw was made for the 2014 SARU Community Cup and the 20 teams were drawn in the 4 pools. The fixtures were released on 15 November 2013.

Pool A

Log

Fixtures and results

Round one

Round two

Round three

Round four

Round five

Pool B

Log

Fixtures and results

Round one

Round two

Round three

Round four

Round five

Pool C

Log

Fixtures and results

Round one

Round two

Round three

Round four

Round five

Pool D

Log

Fixtures and results

Round one

Round two

Round three

Round four

Round five

Finals

Quarter-finals
The winning teams qualified to the Cup semi-finals, while the losing teams qualified to the Bowl semi-finals.

Cup semi-finals
The winning teams qualify to the Cup final, while the losing teams qualify to the Plate final.

Bowl semi-finals
The winning teams qualify to the Bowl final, while the losing teams qualify to the Shield final.

Cup final

Plate final

Bowl final

Shield final

External links
 Official SARU page

References

2014
2014 in South African rugby union
2014 rugby union tournaments for clubs